Liptovská Lúžna is a village and municipality in Ružomberok District in the Žilina Region of northern Slovakia.

History
In historical records the village was first mentioned in 1669.

Geography
The municipality lies at an altitude of 717 metres and covers an area of 54.662 km². It has a population of about 2950 people.

External links
https://web.archive.org/web/20080111223415/http://www.statistics.sk/mosmis/eng/run.html

Villages and municipalities in Ružomberok District